Yannis Becker (born 12 January 1991) is a German professional footballer who most recently played as a left-back or defensive midfielder for Viktoria Berlin.

Career
Becker was one of four players to leave 3. Liga club Viktoria Berlin in the winter transfer window 2021–22 due to "personal reasons".

References

External links
 
 
 profile at Fort Lewis College Athletics
 profile at kickersarchiv.de

1991 births
Living people
People from Rotenburg an der Wümme
Association football defenders
German footballers
SV Werder Bremen II players
Stuttgarter Kickers II players
Stuttgarter Kickers players
Fort Lewis Skyhawks men's soccer players
BSV Schwarz-Weiß Rehden players
FC Viktoria 1889 Berlin players
3. Liga players
Regionalliga players
Footballers from Lower Saxony